Schandra Singh (born 1977) is an American artist.

Biography
Schandra Singh is a first generation American, born in Suffern, NY to immigrant parents. She is the daughter of Anand Singh, an Indian Maharaja and Gisa Singh (née Voigt) an Austrian model. She is the sister of actress Sabine Singh. Schandra Singh received a MFA from Yale in 2006 and her BFA from Rhode Island School of Design in 1999.
 
Singh's large-scale paintings show people in relaxing situations as a form of escape from distress. Stylised and satirical, Singh’s oil works appear to be preoccupied by the absurdity of social notions of rest at a time of incredible unrest. She has been featured in numerous exhibitions in America, Europe and Asia, including: The Saatchi Gallery, London; Sébastien Bertrand, Switzerland; Nature Morte, NY and Berlin; Thomas Erben, NY; MOCA, Shanghai.

In April 2013, Singh was the focus of a story on the public radio program This American Life, where she recounted a tale of her correspondence with a mysterious man in London whose autistic son was a fan of her work. She was also featured in the podcast entitled ‘What Are The Economics of Art’ for The Economist, which won the Gold Lovie award for top podcast in Europe in 2017. Singh’s painting and voice were used to advertise the win.

Her painting about her personal experience of 9/11 in this interview has also been featured in New York Magazine. The 9/11 painting and other of her works were also featured in Elle Magazine, Vogue India, The Wall St. Journal India, and The Wall St. Journal (United States).

Selected exhibitions
2010: If I'm Immune To It, I Don't Deserve To Be Here, Bose Pacia, New York, NY, USA
2009: The Empire Strikes Back: Indian Art Today, The Saatchi Gallery, London, UK
2008: The Sun is not Ridiculous, Galerie Bertrand & Gruner, Geneva, Switzerland
2007: Around and Around 1000 Times, RARE, New York; SCOPE New York, Lincoln Center
2006: Holiday Show, Baumgartner Gallery, New York
2003: Cleary, Gottlieb, Steen & Hamilton, New York; Broom Street Studio Inc., Woodstock
2002: Cycle de Vie, Black Box Studio, Los Angeles
1999: Invitational Show, Woods Gerry Gallery, Providence

References

External links
Artist's official site
Galerie Bertrand & Gruner Schandra Singh works
Further information and images from the Saatchi Gallery
Schandra Singh on ArtFacts.net

1977 births
Living people
21st-century American women artists
American women painters
People from Suffern, New York
Rhode Island School of Design alumni
Yale School of Art alumni
Date of birth missing (living people)